The 2015 Palmer Cup was held on June 12–14, 2015 at Rich Harvest Farms in Big Rock Township, Illinois. The United States won 18 to 12.

Format
On Friday, there were five matches of foursomes in the morning, followed by five four-ball matches in the afternoon. Ten singles matches were played on Saturday, and ten more on Sunday. In all, 30 matches were played.

Each of the 30 matches was worth one point in the larger team competition. If a match was all square after the 18th hole, each side earned half a point toward their team total. The team that accumulated at least 15½ points won the competition.

Teams
Ten college golfers from the United States and Europe participated in the event plus a non-playing head coach and assistant coach for each team.

Friday's matches

Morning foursomes

Afternoon four-ball

Saturday's singles matches

Sunday's singles matches

Michael Carter award
The Michael Carter Award winners were Hunter Stewart and Matthias Schwab.

References

External links
Palmer Cup official site

Arnold Palmer Cup
Golf in Illinois
Palmer Cup
Palmer Cup
Palmer Cup
Palmer Cup